At least seven ships of the Imperial Russian Navy have been named Chesma after the victory during the Battle of Chesma in 1770:
  – 11-gun galley renamed to commemorate the victory; destroyed by fire in 1796
  – 80-gun ship of the line that participated in the Battle of Patras in 1772; scrapped in 1781
  – 74-gun ship of the line; broken up 1828
  – 84-gun ship of the line of the Black Sea Fleet; hulked after 1841
  – 84-gun ship of the line that fought in the Battle of Sinop in 1853 and was scuttled at Sevastopol two years later during the Crimean War
  –  of the Black Sea Fleet; stricken in 1907
  –  predreadnought battleship captured by the Japanese during the Battle of Tsushima in 1905. Renamed  when she was purchased from Japan during World War I as her original name had been given to a new battleship; broken up in 1924.

Russian Navy ship names